50x15 may refer to:
¿Quiere ser millonario? 50 por 15, 50x15, Spanish variant of Who Wants to Be a Millionaire?